Hrejkovice is a municipality and village in Písek District in the South Bohemian Region of the Czech Republic. It has about 500 inhabitants.

Administrative parts
Villages of Chlumek, Níkovice and Pechova Lhota are administrative parts of Hrejkovice.

Gallery

References

Villages in Písek District